Addy García López (born 10 November 1958) is a Mexican politician affiliated with the Institutional Revolutionary Party.  she served as Deputy of the LIX Legislature of the Mexican Congress as a plurinominal representative.

References

1958 births
Living people
People from Villahermosa
Women members of the Chamber of Deputies (Mexico)
Members of the Chamber of Deputies (Mexico)
Institutional Revolutionary Party politicians
Deputies of the LIX Legislature of Mexico